Time is a studio album by Greek singer Demis Roussos, released in 1988 on EMI Bovema B.V.

Commercial performance 
In January 1989 the album debuted at no. 36 in Sweden.

Track listing 
All tracks produced and arranged by Gerard Stellaard.

Charts

References

External links 
 Demis Roussos – Time at Discogs

1988 albums
Demis Roussos albums
EMI Records albums